The CANT Z.509 was a three-engine Italian floatplane developed from the Z.506A for use as a mailplane.

Design and development
Designed as a larger and heavier version of the Z.506A, three aircraft were built in 1937 for Ala Littoria. The aircraft were for use on the airline's transatlantic postal service to South America. The aircraft was a twin-float seaplane powered by three Fiat A.80 R.C.41 radial engines.
With the outbreak of World War II, development of the type was abandoned.

Operators

Ala Littoria

Specifications (Z.509)

See also

References

The Illustrated Encyclopedia of Aircraft (Part Work 1982–1985), 1985, Orbis Publishing
 Thompson, Jonathan W. Italian Civil and Military Aircraft 1930–1945, New York: Aero Publishers Inc., 1963. .

Z.0509
Floatplanes
1930s Italian mailplanes
Trimotors
Low-wing aircraft
Aircraft first flown in 1937